Catherine Mack-Hancock (born 1983) is an Australian actress and director.

Early life

Mack-Hancock started acting an early age, performing locally with the Geelong Society of Dramatic Arts and landing a role in Ch 9's Kids Breakfast TV series. She was educated at Bellbrae Primary School, Grovedale College and the University of Melbourne, where she obtained a Bachelor of Arts degree in Criminology and Philosophy, and a Diploma of Creative Arts. Mack-Hancock revealed to The Sydney Morning Herald's Marcella Bidnost that she had always been interested in health and nutrition"

Career
In 2013, was nominated for a Logie Award for Most Popular Newcomer for her role as Natalie Davison on Home and Away.
Prior to this Mack-Hancock spent two years in New York City studying acting at the Atlantic Theater Company. She returned in 2011 on a scholarship to attend the graduate program, which was based in Los Angeles. The scholarship was awarded to only one international actor. Mack-Hancock also studied at the Ivana Chubbuck Studio in Los Angeles and New York.

Mack-Hancock is best known for her roles on Australian and international television shows such as Channel 9's Pig's Breakfast, Jasper, Pulse, Winners and Losers, Wonderland (guest), and Travail

In January 2011, Rachel Flaherty of the Caulfield Glen Eira Leader reported Mack-Hancock had filmed a guest role in the Seven Network drama series, Winners & Losers. The actress filmed the role shortly before she left for a Los Angeles acting school. She has since had a short film Passenger screen as a finalist at Tropfest 2016, and her latest comedy a finalist for screening at Sundance.

Mack-Hancock has featured in international advertising campaigns such as L'Oreal and Nike and Escape Travel.

On 6 May 2012, Luke Dennehy of the Herald Sun announced Mack-Hancock had joined the cast of Home and Away as Natalie Davison.
She is credited as Catherine Mack on the show.

Personal life
Mack has been in a relationship with actor Rick Donald. The couple announced their engagement in October 2014.

References

External links
 
 

1983 births
Actresses from Melbourne
Australian film actresses
Living people
Year of birth uncertain
Australian soap opera actresses